The Silver Logie for Most Outstanding News Coverage or Public Affairs Report is an award presented annually at the Australian TV Week Logie Awards. The award is given to recognise outstanding news or public affairs reporting.

The first award for news coverage was awarded at the 12th Annual TV Week Logie Awards ceremony, held in 1970 as Best News Reporting. In 1971, two awards were presented for Most Outstanding News Coverage and Most Outstanding Coverage Of Political Affairs with the latter changed to Outstanding Contribution To TV Journalism the following year. From 1973 they were Best News Coverage and Best Public Affairs Program. Over the years, these award categories have changed to recognise news reports, news or public affairs programs, special reports or public affairs reports.

At the 60th Annual TV Week Logie Awards in 2018, the industry voted awards for news and public affairs Most Outstanding News Coverage and Most Outstanding Public Affairs Report were combined to create the award for Most Outstanding News Coverage or Public Affairs Report.

Winners and nominees

Best News Reporting

Most Outstanding News Coverage

Most Outstanding Coverage Of Political Affairs

Outstanding Contribution To TV Journalism

Best News Coverage

Best Public Affairs Program

Best News Report

Outstanding Public Affairs Report

Most Outstanding Achievement in News

Most Outstanding Achievement in Public Affairs

Most Outstanding Public Affairs Program

Most Outstanding Documentary or Special Report in a Public Affairs Program

Most Outstanding Special Report in a Public Affairs Program

Most Outstanding News Coverage

Most Outstanding Public Affairs Report

Most Outstanding Public Affairs Program

Most Outstanding News Coverage or Public Affairs Report

References

External links

Awards established in 1970

1970 establishments in Australia